
 Caspar Henricus Augustinus (Cas) Spijkers (12 January 1946 in Tilburg – 29 October 2011 in Oirschot) was a Dutch head chef and author of several cookbooks. He is also known for his cooking program . In 1984, the cooking of Spijkers earned restaurant De Swaen two Michelin stars.

In 1980, Spijkers became head chef of De Swaen, resulting in a Michelin star in 1981. After Spijkers stepped back as head chef in 1998, the restaurant lost his star.

After The Swaen
"Princess Household Appliances BV" collaborated with Spijkers to promote its kitchen appliances. They also backed him for his "month restaurant" Chez Cas in "De Kersentuin" in Amsterdam in 2006.

In 2007, Spijkers announced the Cas Spijkers Academie. This was a high-end cooking school under his supervision. The Academy, a partnership between Spijkers and several educational centres, started in 2009 in Boxmeer.

Controversy
In 2005, author Ronald Giphart published the book Troost. Giphart claimed that Cas Spijkers and De Swaen were his models for this book. Cas Spijkers was very surprised to hear that he was responsible for the demise of De Swaen, because he left there a few years before they lost their stars.

Personal life
In November 2010, esophageal cancer was discovered.

On the 6th of July 2011, Spijkers was appointed as Knight of the Order of Orange Nassau for his great services to the Dutch culinary culture.

Spijkers died on 29 October 2011, aged 65, from the effects of his illness.

Bibliography 
 En Cas (2005); And Cas
 Cas kookt kunst (2004); Cas cooks Art
 Het basiskookboek (2004); The basic cookbook
 Leer koken met Cas Spijkers (2000); Learn to cook with Cas Spijkers
 Kerst met Cas (1998); Christmas with Cas
 Bijzondere hoofdgerechten (1998); Special main courses
 Bijzondere gerechten met kaas (1997); Special dishes with cheese
 Bijzondere voorgerechten (1997); Special entrees
 Bijzondere nagerechten (1997); Special desserts
 Mijn keuken (1997); My Kitchen
 Cas Spijkers en zijn Swaen (1986, 1998); Cas Spijkers and his Swaen (1986, revised edition 1998)

References

1946 births
2011 deaths
People from Tilburg
Cookbook writers
Dutch chefs
Head chefs of Michelin starred restaurants
Deaths from esophageal cancer
Deaths from cancer in the Netherlands